Christopher Wray may refer to:

Christopher Wray (English judge) (1524–1592), English judge
Christopher Wray (MP) (1601–1646), English politician
Sir Christopher Wray, 4th Baronet (1621–1664), of the Wray baronets
Sir Christopher Wray, 6th Baronet (1652–1679), MP
Christopher Wray (actor) (1940–2014), actor, proprietor of the Christopher Wray Lighting Emporium shop in London
Christopher A. Wray (born 1966), American lawyer, Director of the Federal Bureau of Investigation (FBI)

See also
Christopher Ray (disambiguation)